McVeigh is a surname of Scottish and Irish origin from Gaelic Mac Bheatha or Mac an Bheatha, and a bearer of Mac Beatha is mentioned in the Annals as taking part in the battle of Clontarf in 1014.  The name is common in east Ulster, particularly Armagh. Variations include MacVay, MacVey, McVeagh. Notable people with the surname include: 
 Andrea McVeigh, New Zealand netball commentator
 Annita McVeigh, British newsreader
 Brian J. McVeigh (born 1959), American anthropologist
 Charles McVeigh (1898–1984), Canadian ice hockey player
 Jack McVeigh (born 1996), Australian basketball player
 Jarrad McVeigh (born 1985), Australian rules footballer
 Jimmy McVeigh (born 1949), English football defender
 John McVeigh (footballer) (born 1957), Scottish football midfielder
 John McVeigh (politician) (born 1965), Australian politician
 John J. McVeigh (1921–1944), United States Army soldier
 Mark McVeigh (born 1981), Australian rules footballer
 Paul McVeigh (born 1977), Northern Irish professional footballer
 Timothy McVeigh (1968–2001), American domestic terrorist, perpetrator of the Oklahoma City bombing
 Timothy R. McVeigh (born 1961), United States Navy sailor
 Tom McVeigh (born 1930), Australian politician

See also
McVay, surname
McVey, surname

References